Elyeser (born 25 June 1990), is a Brazilian professional footballer who plays as a midfielder for Paysandu.

References

External links

1999 births
Living people
Brazilian footballers
Association football midfielders
Santos FC players
Mogi Mirim Esporte Clube players
América Futebol Clube (RN) players
Centro Sportivo Alagoano players
Guarani FC players
Paraná Clube players
Grêmio Esportivo Glória players
Associação Olímpica de Itabaiana players
Caxias Futebol Clube players
Goiás Esporte Clube players
Coritiba Foot Ball Club players
Figueirense FC players
Campeonato Brasileiro Série B players
Campeonato Brasileiro Série C players
Campeonato Brasileiro Série D players
Sportspeople from Pará